Love on a Pillow (Le Repos du guerrier) is a 1962 French film starring Brigitte Bardot and directed by Roger Vadim.

Plot
Geneviève Le Theil is a financially independent woman in Paris engaged to Pierre.

She goes to Dijon to collect an inheritance. She enters the wrong hotel room and accidentally foils the suicide of a penniless alcoholic, Renaud, who has taken an overdose of sleeping pills.

Renaud seduces Geneviève and persuades her to take him with her to Paris. Once there she severs ties with her mother, her friends, and Pierre, despite Renaud treating her badly.

When Renaud picks up a prostitute, Genevieve leaves him. But then he proposes marriage and she accepts.

Cast
Brigitte Bardot as Geneviève Le Theil
Robert Hossein as Renaud Sarti
James Robertson-Justice as Katov
Macha Méril as Raphaele
Yves Barsacq as Hotel manager
Jacqueline Porel as Geneviève's mother
Jean-Marc Bory as Pierre
Christian Melsen as Police inspector
Michel Serrault as Varange
Robert Dalban as Police sergeant

References

External links
Love on a Pillow at IMDb
Love on a Pillow at TCMDB

French romantic drama films
Films directed by Roger Vadim
1960s French films